Famous is an unincorporated community in Lincoln County, in the U.S. state of Missouri.

History
A post office called Famous was established in 1883, and remained in operation until 1908. The name Famous was suggested by postal officials.

References

Unincorporated communities in Lincoln County, Missouri
Unincorporated communities in Missouri